The Honseler Schichten Formation is a geologic formation in Germany. It preserves fossils dating back to the Devonian period.

See also 
 List of fossiliferous stratigraphic units in Germany

References 

Devonian Germany
Devonian southern paleotemperate deposits
Devonian southern paleotropical deposits